Burlington was an American Thoroughbred racehorse best known for winning the 1890 Belmont Stakes.

Background

Burlington was bred by Alexander John Alexander at Woodburn Stud in Kentucky. His sire was Powhattan, a son of leading sire Leamington, and his dam was Invercauld. He was purchased by B. Riley at the 1888 Woodburn yearling sale for $425.

Racing career

As a two-year-old, Burlington started 13 times. He won the Criterion Stakes and the Pelham Handicap, and came second in the Independence Stakes, the Seabright Stakes, the Red Bank Stakes, and the August Stakes. After the two-year-old season, he was sold to the Hough Brothers.

During the three-year-old season, Burlington won the Brooklyn Derby. Fifteen days later, on June 10th, 1890, he ran in the Belmont Stakes.  It was the first running of the race at the Morris Park Racecourse, with the closure of the race's previous home Jerome Park Racetrack impending.  The favorite out of the field of nine was Padishah, who'd shown racing promise as a two-year-old. Burlington was sent off at odds of 7-1, the sixth choice to win. Despite these longer odds, Burlington, ridden by African-American jockey Shelby "Pike" Barnes, won the race, beating second place finisher Devotee by a length. Padishah came in third.  

Just two days after the Belmont, Burlington captured the Trial Stakes at Morris Park, and won the Tidal Stakes nine days after that.  That year he also came in third in the Travers Stakes.  Overall, Burlington raced 36 times, and won 15 of them.

Later life

After his racing career, Burlington was retired to stud, siring at least six known horses. In 1904, he was sold to J. E. Lane to stand at stud at Woodmonde and Hattondale farms in Virginia.

Pedigree

References

1887 racehorse births
Racehorses bred in Kentucky
Racehorses trained in the United States
Belmont Stakes winners